William Grove (1532/33 – 1582), of Shaftesbury, Dorset, and Donhead St. Andrew, Wiltshire, was an English Member of Parliament and lawyer.

He was the son of Robert Grove. He was educated at Winchester and New College, Oxford and was admitted to Gray's Inn in 1557.

Grove bought estates at Donhead St Andrew and Sedgehill, both in Wiltshire, in 1563 and 1573 respectively.

He was a Member (MP) of the Parliament of England for Shaftesbury in 1558.

References

1532 births
1582 deaths
English MPs 1558
Alumni of New College, Oxford
Members of Gray's Inn
People educated at Winchester College